The 26th Buil Film Awards ceremony was hosted by the Busan-based daily newspaper Busan Ilbo. It was held on October 13, 2017.

Nominations and winners
Complete list of nominees and winners:

(Winners denoted in bold)

References

External links
 
2017 Buil Film Awards
26th Buil Film Awards at Daum 

2017 film awards
Buil Film Awards
2017 in South Korean cinema
October 2017 events in South Korea